Chang Lih Kang (born 23 October 1980) is a Malaysian politician who has served as the Minister of Science, Technology and Innovation in the Pakatan Harapan (PH) administration under Prime Minister Anwar Ibrahim since December 2022 and the Member of Parliament (MP) for Tanjong Malim since May 2018.  He served as Member of the Perak State Legislative Assembly (MLA) for Teja from March 2008 to May 2018. He is a member of the People's Justice Party (PKR), a component party of the PH coalition. He has also served as Vice President of PKR since December 2018.

Personal life and education 
Lih Kang holds a Bachelor of Engineering in Civil Engineering from Universiti Putra Malaysia and a Master in Public Administration from the Lee Kuan Yew School of Public Policy, National University of Singapore. He has a net worth of RM1 million as of September 2022.

Election results

External links

References

Living people
1980 births
People from Ipoh
People from Perak
Malaysian politicians of Chinese descent
People's Justice Party (Malaysia) politicians
Members of the Dewan Rakyat
Members of the Perak State Legislative Assembly
University of Putra Malaysia alumni
National University of Singapore alumni
21st-century Malaysian politicians
Science ministers of Malaysia